Joseph Alexander Shinsky (born April 2, 1993) is an American former soccer player who is currently an assistant coach for the Temple Owls.

Career

Early 
During his high school years Shinsky was a part of the U.S. U-17 National Team, while competing with them he scored a goal in the FIFA World Cup in Malawi.

Shinsky played club soccer for SuperNova FC and coach Niki Nikolic.

Shinsky was ranked as one of the top recruits in the nation.

College 
Shinsky began his college soccer career at the University of Maryland. In 2011, he made 11 appearances and recorded two assists. In his second season with the Terrapins in 2012, he appeared in 19 games and again registered two assists while helping the Terps become the ACC Champions. In 2013, he appeared in 16 games and scored his first collegiate goal in a 2-1 win in the NCAA tournament quarterfinal match against California to help get Maryland to the College Cup. In 2014, he made 10 appearances, captained the team and notched two goals and two assists.

Professional 
Shinsky was drafted in the fourth round (68th overall) of the 2015 MLS SuperDraft by the Chicago Fire. However, he was not signed by the club.

Shinsky later joined USL Pro club Arizona United.

Coaching 
Shinsky spent two years working with the Army Black Knights men's soccer team before joining the staff of the Temple Owls.

Honors

Maryland Terrapins 
 ACC Conference Champions (2): 2012, 2013
 Big Ten Conference Champions (1): 2014

References 

1993 births
Living people
American soccer players
Maryland Terrapins men's soccer players
Baltimore Bohemians players
Phoenix Rising FC players
Association football midfielders
Soccer players from Pennsylvania
Chicago Fire FC draft picks
USL League Two players
USL Championship players
United States men's youth international soccer players
Army Black Knights men's soccer coaches
Temple Owls men's soccer coaches
Sportspeople from York, Pennsylvania